New York's 47th State Assembly district is one of the 150 districts in the New York State Assembly. It has been represented by Democrat William Colton since 1997.

Geography
District 47 is in Brooklyn. It comprises Bath Beach, Bensonhurst, Gravesend, Dyker Heights and portions of Midwood.

Recent election results

2022

2020

2018

2016

2014

2012

2010

2008

References

Politics of Brooklyn
47